The little minivet (Pericrocotus lansbergei), also known as the Flores minivet, is a species of bird in the family Campephagidae.  It is endemic to Indonesia.  Its natural habitat is subtropical or tropical moist lowland forest.

References

little minivet
Birds of the Lesser Sunda Islands
Birds of Flores
little minivet
little minivet
Taxonomy articles created by Polbot